Ozodagon (formerly Garibak) is a village in Sughd Region, northern Tajikistan. It is part of the jamoat Khurmi in the city of Panjakent.

Notes

References

Populated places in Sughd Region